Lego Space is a Lego theme that features astronauts, space colonization, spaceships, and extraterrestrial life. The theme was originally introduced in 1978, and is among the oldest and most expansive themes in Lego history consisting over 200 individual sets. Lego Space has been sold under the Legoland and Lego System banners.

History

Early Space (1964–1973)
At least three Lego sets were released prior to the Anchor Space theme, predating the standard Lego minifigure. The early Space sets were limited by color selection, and more specialized pieces had not yet been developed. Most Lego sets of this era were composed only of bricks in basic colors. Once Lego began producing individual themes in the 1970s, many new parts were created and original pieces began appearing in new colors.

"Classic" Space (1978–1987)

The first Lego Space sets began an era of more complicated and less colorful designs with a heavy emphasis on space exploration. Much of the early Space sets consisted of blue, grey, (occasionally white), and transparent yellow for ships and gray and transparent green for ground crafts. Designs began using  stacked plates rather than stacked bricks in order to make sleeker spaceship profiles. In its earliest stages, Space sets consisted only of ships and basic wheeled vehicles, but as the number of science-fiction inspired designs grew, the basic pattern of ground-buggies, walking robots, spaceships, and bases developed. With the limited parts selection at the time, sets were still simplistic with designs including minifigure pilots steering their spacecraft with steering wheels, rocket engines as simple, transparent cones affixed to fence pieces, visor-less helmets, and often no in-flight pilot protection other than a spacesuit. The first minifigures released in this theme in 1978 wore either a red or white spacesuit, with yellow spacemen debuting a year later. By the mid-1980s, the color palette had shifted to predominantly white with a transparent blue theme, later used extensively in the Futuron theme. Two new colors of spacemen were introduced in blue and black uniforms. The first helmets had thin chinstraps that would break with normal use. In 1983, the helmet with thicker chinstraps appeared, although they were still susceptible to breakage.

Futuron (1987–1990)
In 1987, Lego added "factions" to its space theme with the introduction of Blacktron and the new subtheme based on space exploration was given the name "Futuron".  The new line kept the logo, aesthetic, and the white and blue color scheme used in the later years of "Classic" Space, but redesigned its minifigures. They came in four colors (red, blue, yellow, and black) and had a new design with a zipper crossing from hip to shoulder with the color above and white below. These figures also featured a newly redesigned helmet with a transparent blue visor. Instead of a large spaceship, the theme centered around the Monorail Transport System, which featured a battery-powered train and some twenty linear feet of track. At the time, this was the most expensive Lego set.

Blacktron (1987–1988)
Along with Futuron, Blacktron was one of the first unified sub-themes in Space. The set designs were based around a black and yellow color scheme with transparent yellow windscreens and transparent red highlights. Blacktron minifigures wore black jumpsuits akin to today's military pilots, with white trim and opaque black visors. Blacktron was a major step forward in set design from the rather clunky "Classic" Space designs. It featured a large spacecraft, the "Renegade", which set the tone for all future big ships by splitting into a number of smaller modules, including a storage bin for a small, wheeled vehicle, that could be recombined not just with each other but with modules from other vehicles in the theme, specifically the "Invader" and "Battrax". This modular interchangeability became a staple of Lego Space until 2001.

Space Police (1989)

In 1989, Lego decided to further its storyline direction with the introduction of Space Police to oppose Blacktron, since police and robbers were popular sellers in its Lego Town theme. The Space Police sets had a black, blue, with red transparent color scheme, and the minifigures shared the torso design with the black Futuron minifigure, but with a transparent red visor. This would be the first time that Lego had a "bad guy", "good guy" and "civilian" faction, a theme that would be used for the next decade. Space Police also used modular systems but on a smaller scale by featuring a Space Police jail cell that could be used interchangeably among almost all sets and came with a Blacktron occupant.

M:Tron (1990–1991)
In 1990, Lego introduced M:Tron, a set designed around magnets. After the introduction of Space Police, M:Tron was introduced as a repair and rescue faction, the space equivalent of a fire brigade. However, for the American market, the faction was depicted as a mining and exploration faction, adapting the names of the sets and the descriptions in the catalogs to reflect this. In catalog pictures and posters, the M:Tron are frequently seen helping Futuron and repairing their vehicles, and the Lego Idea Book 260 features instructions for what appears to be an M:Tron ambulance. The M:Tron theme vehicles are distinctive for their red hulls, gray and black trim, and transparent neon green canopies. They often featured crane-like attachments with magnets for picking up small cargo and toolboxes. These boxes were not interchangeable. The figures wore white trousers, a red shirt with an "M" logo in the middle, and a black helmet with a transparent neon green visor. This theme also extensively used brick-built robot figures (droids) to assist the M:Tron spacemen. These were the last sets produced under the "Legoland" banner before Lego began branding their sets as Lego System.

Blacktron Future Generation (1991–1992)
In 1991, Blacktron was revived as Blacktron Future Generation (commonly called Blacktron II). The sets' color designs were featured around black with white trim, transparent neon green canopies and the minifigures were redesigned with new uniforms and a new logo. It also replaced the widespread interchangeability of Blacktron I with mostly uniform cockpit globes, which could be switched unimpeded between ships in other sets within the theme. However, only four sets of eleven featured them the Alpha Centauri Outpost, Spectral Starguider, Aerial Intruder, and the Allied Avenger).

Space Police II (1992–1993)
The following year, Space Police was also revived, becoming Space Police II, to oppose the new Blacktron. The set designs featured black and grey with transparent green canopies and red trim. The standardized jail cells from the original were retained, though only three vehicles could accept them. The theme also lacked a permanent installation like Space Police I's Space Lock-Up Isolation Base. However, it was the first Space theme to replace the standard Lego smiley face minifigure head with a more complex print (in this case, the face augmented by a fringe of hair and an ear-mounted microphone). Finally, Space Police II ships were known for being under-armed; several vehicles sported no overt weapons (such as the Galactic Chief, whose epaulette-wearing pilot is armed with only a hand-held blaster that might actually be a megaphone), and the others featured only two small cockpit-mounted weapons (including the theme's heavyweight multi-module spaceship, the Galactic Mediator).

Ice Planet 2002 (1993–1994)
In 1993, Ice Planet 2002 took over the civilian role from M:Tron. Based on exploration on an ice planet, sets were designed with skis (both on vehicles and personnel), a blue and white color scheme with transparent neon orange canopies, and transparent neon orange chainsaws. As befitting an icebound theme, most of its vehicles were ground-based, and many of its smaller vehicles also carried satellite dishes, seemingly to track or communicate with the rockets launched by the larger vehicles or its base. This was also the first Space theme to have a named character (Commander Cold) and a female minifigure.

Spyrius (1994–1995)
In 1994, Spyrius replaced Blacktron as the "bad" faction, with sets designed around spying and infiltration. The set designs were mostly red and black with transparent blue canopies. Most spaceships in this theme were shaped like flying saucers and the ground vehicles were designed like giant robots. The faction was often marketed as stealing technology from Unitron. This nine-set theme was the first to feature robot minifigures.

Unitron (1994–1995)
Also in 1994, Unitron took over the "good guy" role from the Space Police II. The Unitron theme revolved around a large monorail system powered by a 9V battery. The four sets were designed in blue and grey with transparent blue canopies and transparent neon green highlights. It also retained Lego interchangeability in the form of small cockpits which could dock on the front or top of its vehicles. Unfortunately, the theme was underdeveloped aside from a ground installation, a large buggy, an advanced-looking spaceship, and the monorail.

Except for the Monorail set, the theme was only released in the United States and Canada.

Exploriens (1996)
In 1996, Lego returned to the white and transparent blue canopies of Futuron with the Exploriens Theme. Sets are known for using large, open (sometimes rickety) structures and special image elements (e.g., as foil-holograph stickers for viewscreens). The Exploriens were searching, evidently, for fossils, and certain flat plates contained triple images: one in white, for the naked eye; one in blue, for viewing under transparent red scanners; and one in red, for viewing under transparent blue scanners. It was the second space theme to include a robot minifigure; some also considered this the second Space theme to include a female minifigure, but this minifigure was a feminine robot named Ann Droid. The android head was taken over from Spyrius. The theme shares many similarities with the popular Star Trek TV Series, with the faction's main focus being on exploration, their robot figure's name being a play on "android", and the faction's insignia resembling Starfleet's insignia.

Roboforce (1997)
In 1997, taking over the "good guy" role was another four-set theme, Roboforce. The sets featured numerous large robots in varying color schemes, run by similarly uniformed pilots. Neon Orange Class features humanoid robots equipped with a buzz saw or a chainsaw. The "head" of each robot was also a small spaceship that could be used as an escape pod or secondary vehicle. Neon Green Class featured animal-shaped robots. The Robo Raptor was the only set not to feature a spacecraft, while the Robo Master's small starcraft strongly resembled the Unitron Star Hawk II as a tribute to the fan favorite set. Roboforce "Robos" were powered by "secret" "robo disks", which were oddly enough rectangle-shaped power sources.

The theme was only released in North America.

UFO (1997–1998)
UFO was the first Lego Space theme to feature non-human looking aliens. All of the UFO's minifigures were cybernetic in nature. They featured two wholly robot figures. Many of its spaceships used saucers or half-saucers as elements befitting its name. It has the smallest proportion of wheeled ground vehicles to ships (two to nine) of any Lego Space theme before or since. The UFO theme is often considered the first Space theme to heavily rely on large pieces meant to provide effects (such as curvature) that would be difficult to achieve with traditional Lego pieces, which became common over the next decade.

Insectoids (1998–1999)
The second alien-looking race, the Insectoids were insect-like humanoid cyborgs especially interested in "energy orbs", which included magnetic stickers so that magnets attached to cranes could lift them. According to the LEGO Group, the Insectoids had crash-landed on an alien planet filled with giant bugs. They were forced to disguise themselves and their spaceships as bugs to steal their giant egg orbs to refuel their spaceships and escape.

The Insectoids are usually considered to be the last Classic Space sub-theme in which the entire theme is "good", "bad", or "civilian". With the advent of Lego Star Wars, the classic Lego Space line was ended.

Life on Mars (2001)
Life on Mars is a space theme released in 2001, around a time of increased curiosity about the red planet. The theme revolved around the concept of lifeforms that could possibly exist on Mars. This theme is generally considered to be part of classic Lego Space.

This was the first theme to feature two types of minifigures: human astronauts (from Lego Town) and Martian aliens (native to Mars). The sets denote peaceful coexistence between the two species on the planet Mars. The Life on Mars theme pioneered several unique aspects of Lego. It used a pneumatic pump system capable of sending Martian minifigures through tubes in the 7317 Aero Tube Hangar set. This system would later be seen in the Mars Mission theme to shoot missiles. The theme also introduced several new muted colors to the Lego color palette, including Sand Green, Sand Blue, Sand Red, and Sand Purple. Sets were designed to separate into segments easily to encourage children to mix and create their unique vehicles out of human and alien sets. The Humans had a white and blue color scheme, while the Aliens had a variety of colors.

Martians in the Life on Mars theme were unique in that they were named after real-life stars and constellations: Altair, Centauri, Antares, Canopus, Pollux, Vega, Arcturus, Cassiopeia, Mizar, and Rigel.

Mars Mission (2007–2008)

Mars Mission is the second Mars space theme to feature both humans and aliens and is a reboot of Life on Mars. Unlike Life on Mars, the aliens (an alien race from another planet) and humans were adversaries. Like with Life on Mars theme, this set is generally viewed as a sequel to the first Martian sets.

Space Police III (2009–2010)
Space Police III continued the Lego trend of humans (or at least human-looking) versus aliens started in the former Mars Mission theme. This is the first time the Space Police have been pitted against monstrous-looking aliens instead of human-looking villains, like Blacktron or Spyrius. It is also the first Space Police theme to include enemy ships instead of just prisoners and is the first Space Police theme in 16 years. A gang, including: Kranxx, Snake, the Skull Twins, Slizer and Squidman, are the main troublemakers for Space Police III with independent, Frenzy, keeping them busy as well. However, Rench bears the old Blacktron Future Generation logo on his uniform (which is an updated original Blacktron uniform), hinting that he may have a connection with the old Blacktron faction, as well as hinting that the Space Police are in the same continuity as their older versions.

Alien Conquest (2011)
Alien Conquest was released on May 17, 2011, and is the first sub-theme to feature aliens on Earth; specifically, a new wave of aliens begins attacking Earth. Multiple cities around the globe report massive abductions and UFOs in the night sky. The UFOs are finally identified as aliens in saucer-shaped spacecraft who are abducting humans for brainpower to fuel their spaceships, which resemble the Classic UFO line of space. Panic breaks out worldwide, and the Alien Defense Unit takes up the cause. Using their ubiquitous blue vehicles, they fight back against the aliens, stopping abductions in their tracks.

Galaxy Squad (2013)
2013's space-specific theme Galaxy Squad features a team of intergalactic heroes and robot sidekicks trying to defeat an alien race of space bugs - humanoids with insect features - intent on "cocooning" the galaxy with special two-piece cocoons that can each enclose a standard minifigure. The heroes' vehicles feature a notable "split function" ability, which allows them to split into two different vehicles. In the storyline, Galaxy Squad was a direct continuation of Lego Monster Fighters and was directly succeeded by Lego Ultra Agents. In Monster Fighters, the team activated a beam that attracted a swarm of bugs leading to the events of Galaxy Squad, where after the big battle, Solomon blaze returned to Earth, thus creating the events of Ultra Agents.

Timeline of Lego Space themes

Other space-related Lego sets

Classic Space references in other sets

Lego Ideas released a non-licensed set based on the Classic Space line in 2014, the 21109 Exo Suit, which includes two minifigures in green suits printed with the Classic Space logo.

One of the main characters in The Lego Movie and its sequel, The Lego Movie 2, Benny (voiced by Charlie Day), is a blue Classic Space minifigure with notable signs of wear and tear, including a broken chinstrap on his helmet. A set released for the film, 70816 "Benny's Spaceship, Spaceship, SPACESHIP!", featured a spaceship highly reminiscent of Classic Space spaceships, with a predominantly blue and grey colour scheme. For the sequel, The Lego Movie 2: The Second Part, a set called "Benny's Space Squad" was released, featuring Benny, along with three astronauts: Kenny, Jenny, and Lenny, which were colored yellow, white, and pink respectively. Another set released for the film, "Emmet and Benny's Build and Fix Workshop," contained a spaceship that imitated the appearance of Classic Space sets. In October 2020, an orange version of the Classic Space astronaut was released with the book Lego Minifigure: A Visual History.

Lego released an updated version of the Galaxy Explorer for their 90th-anniversary celebrations in 2022. Like the original, it included four astronaut minifigures, a robot, and a pull-out rover from the back but excluded the baseplate and satellite tower. Lego also released digital instructions for two alternate builds based on 924 "Space Cruiser" and 918 "Space Transport".

There has been occasional references to Blacktron and other Space sub-themes in newer sets and minifigures as well.

Related sets and themes

 Lego produced two sub-themes with space-related content for its Town line with Launch Command in 1995, and Space Port in 1999.
 Since 1999, Lego has produced sets based on the Star Wars franchise. Nearly 700 sets have been produced, six video games and numerous other licensed merchandise.
 2003's Discovery theme produced six sets related to past and present NASA efforts at the time, including the Apollo Program, the Space Shuttle, the International Space Station, and the Mars Exploration Rover mission.
 In 2008, two fan-designed space sets were released through the Lego Factory theme, Star Justice and Space Skulls were fan-designed sets; they were special edition sets available only through Lego.
 In 2010, Lego released a set under its Toy Story theme called Buzz's Star Command Spaceship. Three more sets were released in 2022 for the spin-off film Lightyear, which is based on the Buzz Lightyear toy's background from that universe.
 Lego produced space themes for its Lego City line involving a realistic, Earth-based approach to space exploration: one in 2011, 2015, a Mars centric theme in 2019, and one in 2022 featuring both Mars and the Moon, These sub-themes are not considered to be official Lego Space themes.
 Since 2012, Lego has produced sets from both the Marvel and DC comic book universes, both of which feature many elements derived from space.
 In 2012, Lego released a set under its Ideas theme (known back then as Cuusoo) based on the spacecraft Hayabusa created by the Japanese Aerospace Exploration Agency (JAXA).
 In 2014, Lego Ideas released a set based on NASA's Curiosity rover.
 In 2015, Lego Ideas released a set based on the BBC science fiction TV series Doctor Who, along with two expansion packs for the toys-to-life video game Lego Dimensions.
 In 2017, Lego Creator released two space-related sets, 31062 Robot Explorer and 31066 Space Shuttle Explorer. Lego Ideas also released a set based on the Saturn V rocket used during the Apollo 11 mission. One called "Women of NASA" that containing four minifigures based on female NASA scientists Sally Ride, Margaret Hamilton, Mae Jemison, and Nancy Grace Roman, with Katherine Johnson missing from the original submission due to licensing issues.
 In 2018, a set from the film The Lego Batman Movie called the "Bat-Space Shuttle" was released.
 In 2019, Lego Creator Expert released a set based on the Apollo 11 Lunar Lander to commemorate the 50th anniversary of the first moon landing in 1969. and a model of the Space Shuttle Discovery was released in early 2021, based on the STS-31 mission which deployed the Hubble Space Telescope.

See also
Lego Mars Mission
Lego Brawls

References

External links 
 Official website 

Space
Products introduced in 1978
Fiction about outer space